The Cecil Sharp Project was a multi-artist, residential commission to create new material based on the life and collections of the founding father of the English Folk Revival Cecil Sharp.  

The residential took place in March 2011, immediately followed by concerts in Shrewsbury and London, with the artists also performing the results of the project at the Shrewsbury Folk Festival in August 2011.

The project was a joint commission between Shrewsbury Folk Festival and EFDSS, the overall management of the project was the responsibility of Shrewsbury Folk Festival and was directed by Neil Pearson and Alan Surtees.

Artists
The eight musicians selected for the project were 
 Steve Knightley
 Jim Moray
 Jackie Oates
 Andy Cutting
 Patsy Reid
 Caroline Herring
 Kathryn Roberts
 Leonard Podolak

Dates
March 18–25, 2011. Residential at Acton Scott, Shropshire
March 24, 2011. Performance at Theatre Severn, Shrewsbury
March 26, 2011. Performance at Cecil Sharp House, London
March 27, 2011. Performance at Cecil Sharp House, London
August 28, 2011. Performance at Shrewsbury Folk Festival, Shrewsbury

CD
The initial three performances were recorded for a CD release, with a release date 30 August 2011.
As with the Shrewsbury Folk Festival's previous commission, the Darwin Song Project, the CD was mixed by Stu Hanna,

References

 Cecil Sharp Project – review | Music | The Guardian
 BBC Radio 2 - Mike Harding, Steve Knightley Talks About the Cecil Sharp Project
 What's on: The Cecil Sharp Project, Burnley, January 26 (From Lancashire Telegraph)
 Review: Cecil Sharp Project @ Burnley Mechanics (From Lancashire Telegraph)

External links
The Cecil Sharp Project website
Shrewsbury Folk Festival website
EFDSS website

Folk compilation albums
2011 compilation albums